When You Come Back To Me (Spanish: Cuando vuelvas a mí) is a 1953 drama film directed by José Baviera. It was a co-production between Mexico and Guatemala.

Cast
   Ramón Armengod  
 Lilia del Valle  
 José Baviera  
 Mario Abularach 
 Luis Aguirre  
 Antonio Almorza  
 María Luisa Aragón  
 Enrique Arce Vélez 
 Olga de Arce   
 Mildred Chávez  
 Otto Coronado  
 Carlos Figueroa 
 René García 
 Titina Leal  
 José Antonio Lemus  
 Augusto Monterroso 
 Marion del Valle 
 Luis Villavicencio

References

Bibliography 
 María Luisa Amador. Cartelera cinematográfica, 1950-1959. UNAM, 1985.

External links 
 

1953 films
1953 drama films
Mexican drama films
Guatemalan drama films
1950s Spanish-language films
Films directed by José Baviera
Guatemalan black-and-white films
1950s Mexican films